Wayne Madsen may refer to:

 Wayne Madsen (journalist) (born 1954), American journalist and conspiracy theorist
 Wayne Madsen (sportsperson) (born 1984), English cricketer